Tumasyan is an Armenian surname. The name is patronymic, derived from the Armenian equivalent of Thomas, making the name equivalent to Thompson. Notable people with the surname include:

 Aleksandr Sergeyevich Tumasyan (born 1955), Russian football coach
 Aleksandr Aleksandrovich Tumasyan (born 1992), Armenian football player
 Denis Tumasyan (born 1985), Russian footballer 
 Sergei Tumasyan (born 1990), Russian footballer
 Nara Tumasyan, Armenian actress, TV presenter

Armenian-language surnames
Patronymic surnames
Surnames from given names